Matthew John Carroll (born August 28, 1980) is an American former professional basketball player.

He played high school basketball at Hatboro-Horsham High School in Horsham, Pennsylvania, under coach Walt Ostrowski. He played college basketball at the University of Notre Dame.

Early career

At Hatboro-Horsham High School, Carroll averaged 26.5 points, 7.3 rebounds and four assists per game as a senior shooting guard. He recorded even more rebounds and assists his first three seasons, when he started at point guard for the Hatters.

At the end of high school, Carroll ranked second in scoring in the history of southeastern Pennsylvania, trailing only former Los Angeles Lakers star Kobe Bryant. Carroll surpassed Bryant by becoming the only Pennsylvania player to be named Mr. Basketball twice.

Basketball gurus around the nation noticed, as they twice selected Carroll for the United States Junior National Team. That selection teamed Carroll up with players such as the Orlando Magic's Mike Miller, Stanford's Casey Jacobsen and Arizona's Michael Wright to compete in the Dominican Republic in 1998 and Portugal in 1999.

In addition to the U.S. junior national team, Carroll made it onto the roster for prep all-star games such as the Magic Johnson Roundball Classic, where he finally had the chance to play for his grandfather, and the Capital Classic in Washington, D.C.

He was recruited by coach John MacLeod, played for Matt Doherty as a freshman and played the rest of his college career for former Delaware coach Mike Brey at the University of Notre Dame.

College career
Carroll played in 133 games over his four-year career at the University of Notre Dame and averaged 13.9 points, 4.3 rebounds, 2.4 assists and 0.9 steals. He finished sixth on Notre Dame's all-time leading scoring list with 1,850 points.

Carroll also ranks as Notre Dame's second all-time leader in three-point field goals made (301) behind Colin Falls (331), three-point field goals attempted (762), games played (133), games started (125) and second in free throw percentage (.825). He scored in double figures in 96 of 133 career games. He was named All-American Honorable Mention by the Associated Press and All-Big East First Team as a senior.

Professional career
Carroll entered the 2003 NBA draft but went undrafted. He signed with the New York Knicks as a free agent and played in their summer league. He spent the 2003–04 training camp with New York and was one of the Knicks' final cuts.

Portland Trail Blazers
Carroll signed with the Portland Trail Blazers as a free agent on November 7, 2003 and appeared in 13 games for Portland during the 2003–04 season and averaged 1.0 points. He was released by the Trail Blazers on January 7, 2004.

Roanoke Dazzle
After being cut by the Blazers in the 2003–04 season, Carroll signed with the Roanoke Dazzle of the NBA Development League. He played 11 games with the Dazzle before signing with the Spurs. Carroll scored 15.5 points and registered 2.8 rebounds a game.

Carroll re-signed with the Roanoke Dazzle on December 11, where he excelled — being named 2004–05 NBADL Most Valuable Player. He led all scorers in the NBADL with 20.1 points in 24 games. He also averaged 2.8 rebounds, 1.6 assists and 1.1 steals in 31.7 minutes. He shot .503 from the field (177–352) and .605 from the three-point line (23–38). Carroll scored an NBADL season-high 43 points against the Florida Flame on February 9 and was named NBADL Player of the Month in January after averaging 22.3 points. After January 1, Carroll led Roanoke to a 14–4 record and first place in the NBADL.

San Antonio Spurs
Carroll signed with the San Antonio Spurs as a free agent on March 8, 2004 for the remainder of the season. He appeared in three games for San Antonio during the 2003–04 season and averaged 2.0 points.

Carroll played in the 2004 Summer League for the Golden State Warriors. He appeared in six games for Golden State during the preseason and averaged 2.8 points and 1.0 rebounds before being released prior to the regular season and returned to Roanoke Dazzle.

Charlotte Bobcats
Carroll signed with the expansion Charlotte Bobcats on February 23, 2005 and appeared in 25 games and averaged 9.0 points and 2.4 rebounds in 17.2 minutes. In his first season with the Bobcats, Carroll reached double-figure scoring 12 times and scored a career-high 22 points at Washington on April 17. He also posted six consecutive games with 10-plus points from April 5–16.

Carroll became a free agent in the summer of 2005 and was re-signed by the Bobcats. He played in all but four of the Bobcats games in 2005–06, averaging 7.6 pts and two rebounds in 16 minutes per game. The team picked up his option for the 2006–07 season. Carroll gained some media attention after completing five four-point plays during the regular season. The record for four-point plays in one NBA season stands at six, and belongs to Mitch Richmond.

In 2006–07, Carroll had his best NBA season by far, averaging 12.1 ppg, 2.9 rpg, and 1.3 apg. He also led the Bobcats in free throw percentage, shooting .904 from the line, as well as three-point percentage, shooting .416 from beyond the arc.

On July 17, 2007, Matt Carroll re-signed with the Bobcats. Bobcats executive vice president of basketball operations Bernie Bickerstaff had the following comments: "Matt was one of our off-season priorities and we are glad to have him back. [...] He has proven to be the consummate professional on and off the court, and his production has continued to increase since he joined us from the D-League over two years ago."

Dallas Mavericks
On January 16, 2009, Carroll was traded to the Dallas Mavericks along with Ryan Hollins in exchange for DeSagana Diop.

Second stint with the Bobcats
On July 13, 2010, Carroll was traded back to the Charlotte Bobcats along with Erick Dampier and Eduardo Nájera in exchange for Tyson Chandler and Alexis Ajinça.

New Orleans Hornets
On November 13, 2012, Carroll was traded by the Bobcats to the New Orleans Hornets in exchange for Hakim Warrick. He was waived by the Hornets on November 20, 2012.

Post-playing career
On March 18, 2014, Carroll was named the Charlotte Hornets' Community Ambassador.

Personal life
His brother, Pat, starred at Saint Joseph's University.

NBA career statistics

Regular season

|-
| style="text-align:left;"|
| style="text-align:left;"|Portland
| 13 || 0 || 3.7 || .455 || .333 || 1.000 || .2 || .1 || .0 || .0 || 1.0
|-
| style="text-align:left;"|
| style="text-align:left;"|San Antonio
| 3 || 0 || 7.3 || .400 ||  || .500 || 1.0 || .3 || .3 || .0 || 2.0
|-
| style="text-align:left;"|
| style="text-align:left;"|Charlotte
| 25 || 0 || 17.2 || .389 || .333 || .855 || 2.4 || .7 || .7 || .1 || 9.0
|-
| style="text-align:left;"|
| style="text-align:left;"|Charlotte
| 78 || 6 || 16.3 || .403 || .389 || .821 || 2.0 || .4 || .6 || .1 || 7.6
|-
| style="text-align:left;"|
| style="text-align:left;"|Charlotte
| 72 || 47 || 26.1 || .433 || .416 || .904 || 2.9 || 1.3 || .7 || .1 || 12.1
|-
| style="text-align:left;"|
| style="text-align:left;"|Charlotte
| 80 || 18 || 25.2 || .428 || .436 || .804 || 2.8 || .9 || .6 || .2 || 9.0
|-
| style="text-align:left;"|
| style="text-align:left;"|Charlotte
| 34 || 10 || 14.0 || .406 || .267 || .789 || 1.6 || .7 || .5 || .2 || 4.1
|-
| style="text-align:left;"|
| style="text-align:left;"|Dallas
| 21 || 0 || 6.7 || .273 || .125 || 1.000 || .7 || .1 || .1 || .1 || 1.2
|-
| style="text-align:left;"|
| style="text-align:left;"|Dallas
| 25 || 0 || 4.8 || .360 || .211 || 1.000 || .5 || .2 || .2 || .0 || 1.8
|-
| style="text-align:left;"|
| style="text-align:left;"|Charlotte
| 54 || 1 || 10.8 || .447 || .370 || .769 || 1.3 || .4 || .3 || .1 || 4.4
|-
| style="text-align:left;"|
| style="text-align:left;"|Charlotte
| 53 || 2 || 11.2 || .331 || .186 || .789 || 1.1 || .7 || .3 || .1 || 2.7
|-
| style="text-align:left;"|
| style="text-align:left;"|Charlotte
| 1 || 0 || 6.0 ||  ||  ||  || .0 || 1.0 || .0 || .0 || .0
|- class="sortbottom"
| style="text-align:center;" colspan="2"|Career
| 459 || 84 || 16.5 || .413 || .384 || .841 || 1.9 || .7 || .5 || .1 || 6.6

Playoffs

|-
| style="text-align:left;"|2009
| style="text-align:left;"|Dallas
| 4 || 0 || 3.5 || .500 ||  ||  || .5 || .0 || .0 || .0 || .5
|-
| style="text-align:left;"|2010
| style="text-align:left;"|Dallas
| 1 || 0 || 5.0 || 1.000 ||  ||  || 1.0 || .0 || .0 || .0 || 2.0
|- class="sortbottom"
| style="text-align:center;" colspan="2"|Career
| 5 || 0 || 3.6 || .667 || .000 || .000 || .6 || .0 || .0 || .0 || .8

References

External links

 Carroll Camps
 Carroll carves own mark into family game
 Renewing a great rivalry
 Carroll wild about Bobcats
 Carroll becomes Bobats' go-to guy
 Carroll's tune catching on in NBA

1980 births
Living people
American men's basketball players
Basketball players from Pittsburgh
Charlotte Bobcats players
Dallas Mavericks players
Notre Dame Fighting Irish men's basketball players
People from Horsham Township, Pennsylvania
Portland Trail Blazers players
Roanoke Dazzle players
San Antonio Spurs players
Shooting guards
Sportspeople from Montgomery County, Pennsylvania
Undrafted National Basketball Association players